Ivan Tomečak (born 7 December 1989) is a Croatian professional footballer who plays for Lokomotiva in the Croatian Football League. He is usually deployed as a right full-back, but is often used as a right winger or left full-back.

Club career

Dinamo Zagreb

Loan to Lokomotiva
On 14 August 2007, Tomečak joined Croatian third-tier club Lokomotiva on an 18-month loan spell. He played in almost every match of 2007–08 season and helped Lokomotiva win the promotion to Druga HNL. In 2008–09 season he featured in all 15 of Lokomotiva's league matches before his loan finished.

Return to Dinamo Zagreb
Tomečak returned from loan on 1 January 2009 and has played an important part in Dinamo's 2008–09 championship title. His debut came on 1 March 2009 in a home match against Slaven Belupo, which Dinamo won 1–0. On 5 April 2009, he scored his first ever goal for Dinamo Zagreb, entering the match in 74th minute against Cibalia and scoring two crucial goals in Dinamo's 4–3 away win. He also played in both legs of 2009 Croatian Cup finals which Dinamo won third time consecutively, defeating Hajduk Split 4–3 after penalty shootout. With Dinamo Zagreb, Tomečak has won two consecutive domestic league titles, making a total of 30 league appearances for the club during the two seasons following his return. He also made his debut in the European competitions on 21 July 2009 in a 2009–10 UEFA Champions League match against Pyunik Yerevan which Dinamo Zagreb won 3–0.

At the start of the 2010–11 season, Tomečak won his fourth honour with Dinamo Zagreb, as the club won the 2010 Croatian Supercup.

On 22 November 2011, Tomečak scored Dinamo's second goal in the 2011–12 UEFA Champions League, netting a header in Dinamo's 6-2 away loss to Real Madrid at the Santiago Bernabéu.

Rijeka
On 7 June 2013, Tomečak signed a three-year contract with HNK Rijeka. He scored on his official debut for the club on 12 July 2013, opening the score in the 16th minute of a league match against NK Istra 1961. He immediately established himself as a regular starter both in Prva HNL and Europe. On 7 May 2014, Tomečak scored the winning goal in Rijeka's away win at GNK Dinamo Zagreb in the first leg of the 2014 Croatian Football Cup Final.

Later years
On 31 August 2015, Tomečak signed a two-year contract with Ukrainian club Dnipro Dnipropetrovsk, for a fee of €1 million. However, his contract was terminated in July 2016 after the club faced financial difficulties.

Subsequently, Tomečak switched clubs and countries and signed for Saudi Arabian club Al-Nassr which was managed by fellow Croatian and former Dinamo Zagreb manager Zoran Mamić. In his only season with the Saudi club he scored three goals and gave five assists.

In August 2017, he moved to Belgian club KV Mechelen and penned a two-year contract.

In January 2018, Tomečak moved to Mechelen's league rivals Club Brugge KV signing a -year contract. The transfer fee was reported as €1 to 1.5 million

Return to Rijeka
On 5 February 2019 Tomečak signed for HNK Rijeka as a free agent.

International career
Tomečak started his international career for Croatia with the friendly match for the under-18 team in a match against Poland under-18. He made three more friendly match appearances for the under-18 team before he debuted for the under-19 team on 18 September 2007 in a friendly match against Slovenia under-19. He made a total of seven appearances for the under-19 selection before debuting for the under-20 and under-21 teams. He made two appearances in friendly matches for the under-20 team throughout the 2009 and 2010. On 7 June 2009, Tomečak debuted for the under-21 team in a qualifying match against Cyprus under-21.

He made his senior debut on 12 November 2014 in a friendly match against Argentina in London, coming as a 71st-minute substitute for Hrvoje Milić.

Career statistics

Honours
Lokomotiva
Croatian Third League Promotion: 2007-08

Dinamo Zagreb
Croatian First League : 2008–09, 2009–10, 2010–11, 2011–12, 2012–13
Croatian Cup: 2008–09, 2010–11, 2011–12
Croatian Super Cup: 2010

Rijeka
Croatian Cup: 2013–14, 2018–19, 2019–20
Croatian Super Cup: 2014

Club Brugge
Belgian First Division A: 2017-18
Belgian Super Cup: 2018

References

External links
 

1989 births
Living people
Footballers from Zagreb
Association football fullbacks
Croatian footballers
Croatia youth international footballers
Croatia under-21 international footballers
Croatia international footballers
GNK Dinamo Zagreb players
NK Lokomotiva Zagreb players
HNK Rijeka players
FC Dnipro players
Al Nassr FC players
K.V. Mechelen players
Club Brugge KV players
Pafos FC players
Second Football League (Croatia) players
First Football League (Croatia) players
Croatian Football League players
Ukrainian Premier League players
Saudi Professional League players
Belgian Pro League players
Cypriot First Division players
Croatian expatriate footballers
Croatian expatriate sportspeople in Ukraine
Expatriate footballers in Ukraine
Croatian expatriate sportspeople in Saudi Arabia
Expatriate footballers in Saudi Arabia
Croatian expatriate sportspeople in Belgium
Expatriate footballers in Belgium
Croatian expatriate sportspeople in Cyprus
Expatriate footballers in Cyprus